Christoph Betzl (born 13 February 1949) is a former international speedway rider from West Germany.

Speedway career 
Betzl reached the final of the Speedway World Championship in the 1979 Individual Speedway World Championship representing West Germany. He has also reached the final of the Individual Speedway Long Track World Championship on eight occasions in 1974, 1975, 1976, 1977, 1979, 1980, 1981 and 1982. He won a bronze medal in the 1980 final and a silver medal in the 1981 final.

He rode in the top tier of British Speedway, riding for Poole Pirates.

World final appearances

Individual World Championship
 1979 –  Chorzów, Silesian Stadium – 14th – 2pts

World Pairs Championship
 1975 -  Wrocław, Olympic Stadium (with Fritz Baur) - 6th - 10pts (6)

World Longtrack Championship
 1974 –  Scheeßel 12th 8pts
 1975 –  Gornja Radgona 5th 17pts
 1976 –  Marianske Lazne 8th 10pts
 1977 –  Aalborg 11th 9pts
 1979 –  Marianske Lazne 13th 6pts
 1980 –  Scheeßel 3rd 16pts
 1981 –  Gornja Radgona 2nd 20pts
 1982 –  Esbjerg 10th 7pts

Individual Ice Speedway World Championship
1971 -  Inzell 14th 4pts
1973 –  Inzell 15th 3pts

References 

1949 births
Living people
German speedway riders
Poole Pirates riders